Taigan is a sighthound breed from Kyrgyzstan

Taigan may also refer to:

Taigan (safari park), a lion safari park in Crimea
 , Crimea